Yang Pao-lin (29 June 1911 – 2 July 1993) was a Chinese politician. She was among the first group of women elected to the Legislative Yuan in 1948.

Biography
She served as president of the Shandong Women's Association from 1945 to 1946 and as chair of the Shandong Women's Movement Committee from 1945 to 1947. She also headed the women's section of the Shandong People's Self-Defence Corps. She married , a politician, and had two daughters.

Yang was a Kuomintang candidate in Shandong in the 1948 elections for the Legislative Yuan and was elected to parliament. She relocated to Taiwan during the Chinese Civil War, where she became an executive member of the Taiwan Consumer's Association. She died in 1993.

References

1911 births
Chinese schoolteachers
Members of the Kuomintang
20th-century Chinese women politicians
Members of the 1st Legislative Yuan
Members of the 1st Legislative Yuan in Taiwan
1993 deaths